is a Japanese manga series written and illustrated by Osamu Akimoto. It was serialized in Shueisha's seinen manga magazine Weekly Young Jump from February 2017 to March 2018, with its chapters collected in a single tankōbon volume.

Publication
Written and illustrated by Osamu Akimoto, Finder: Kyoto Jogakuin Monogatari''' was serialized in Shueisha's seinen manga magazine Weekly Young Jump from February 2, 2017, to March 29, 2018. Shueisha collected its chapters in a single tankōbon'' volume, released on April 19, 2018.

References

Further reading

External links
 

Seinen manga
Shueisha manga
Slice of life anime and manga
Works about photography